Rungphet Wor Rungniran is a Thai Muay Thai fighter. He currently teaches at Evolve MMA in Singapore.

Titles and accomplishments

 2012 Channel 7 Boxing Stadium 126 lbs Champion
 Omnoi Stadium 118 lbs Champion
 2009 Lumpinee Stadium 115 lbs Champion
 Omnoi Stadium 115 lbs Champion
 Channel 7 Stadium 105 lbs Champion

Fight record

|-  style="background:#fbb;"
| 2018-07-29|| Loss||align=left| Kotaro Shimano || MA Japan Kick - Tekken 11 || Chiba (city), Japan || Decision (Unanimous)|| 3 || 3:00
|-  style="background:#cfc;"
| 2017-11-05|| Win||align=left| Yuu Wor.Wanchai || Suk Wanchai＋NorNaksin Tokyo MuayThai Super Fight || Tokyo, Japan || Decision (Unanimous)|| 3 || 3:00
|-  style="background:#fbb;"
| 2016-12-25|| Loss ||align=left| Senkeng Kelasport || Channel 7 Boxing Stadium  || Bangkok, Thailand || Decision || 5 || 3:00
|-  style="background:#fbb;"
| 2016-09-18|| Loss ||align=left| Palangchai Por.Phinabhat || Komchadluek Boxing Stadium  || Thailand || KO || 4 ||
|-  style="background:#cfc;"
| 2016-06-26|| Win ||align=left| Yuthakan Thor.Thepsuthin || Rangsit Boxing Stadium  || Thailand || Decision || 5 || 3:00
|-  style="background:#c5d2ea;"
| 2016-03-26|| Draw ||align=left| Phornsawan Chokpraneefarm || Lumpinee Stadium || Bangkok, Thailand || Decision ||5 || 3:00
|- style="background:#fbb;"
| 2016-01-31 || Loss||align=left| Mongkolpetch Petchyindee || Rangsit Boxing Stadium || Thailand || KO || 1 ||
|-  style="background:#fbb;"
| 2015-11-24|| Loss ||align=left| Yuthakan Thor.Thepsuthin ||   || Thailand || Decision || 5 || 3:00
|-  style="background:#cfc;"
| 2015-09-13|| Win ||align=left| Yuthakan Thor.Thepsuthin || Channel 7 Boxing Stadium  || Bangkok, Thailand || Decision || 5 || 3:00
|-  style="background:#fbb;"
| 2015-08-06|| Loss ||align=left| Extra Sitworaphat || Rajadamnern Stadium || Bangkok, Thailand || Decision ||5 || 3:00
|-  style="background:#cfc;"
| 2015-06-14|| Win ||align=left| Yuthakan Thor.Thepsuthin ||  || Mueang Ratchaburi District, Thailand || Decision ||5 || 3:00
|-  style="background:#fbb;"
| 2015-04-25 || Loss ||align=left| Phetmorakot Teeded99 || Channel 7 Boxing Stadium  || Bangkok, Thailand || Decision || 5 || 3:00
|-  style="background:#cfc;"
| 2015-02-27|| Win ||align=left| Denchiangkwan Lamtongkarnpeth || Lumpinee Stadium || Bangkok, Thailand || Decision ||5 || 3:00
|-  style="background:#fbb;"
| 2015-01-15|| Loss ||align=left| Kaotam Lookprabaht || Rajadamnern Stadium || Bangkok, Thailand || Decision ||5 || 3:00
|-  style="background:#fbb;"
| 2014-11-24|| Loss||align=left| Fonpanlarn P.K.SanchaiMuaythaiGym || Rajadamnern Stadium || Bangkok, Thailand || Decision ||5 || 3:00
|-  style="background:#cfc;"
| 2014-09-11|| Win||align=left| Surachai Srisuriyanyothin || Rajadamnern Stadium || Bangkok, Thailand || Decision ||5 || 3:00
|-  style="background:#fbb;"
| 2014-03-30|| Loss||align=left| Pettawee Sor Kittichai||  || Songkhla province, Thailand || Decision || 5 || 3:00 
|-  style="background:#fbb;"
| 2013-10-03|| Loss||align=left| Kengsiam Nor Siripung || Rajadamnern Stadium || Bangkok, Thailand || Decision ||5 || 3:00
|-  style="background:#fbb;"
| 2013-09-06|| Loss||align=left| Rungpet Kaiyanghadao || Lumpinee Stadium || Bangkok, Thailand || Decision ||5 || 3:00
|-
! style=background:white colspan=9 |
|-  style="background:#c5d2ea;"
| 2013-04-26|| Draw||align=left| Yuthakan Thor.Thepsuthin || Lumpinee Stadium || Bangkok, Thailand || Decision ||5 || 3:00
|-  style="background:#fbb;"
| 2013-02-12|| Loss||align=left| Lukman Fonjangchonburi || Lumpinee Stadium || Bangkok, Thailand || Decision ||5 || 3:00
|-  style="background:#cfc;"
| 2012-12-02|| Win ||align=left| Rakkiat Kiatprapat  || Channel 7 Boxing Stadium || Bangkok, Thailand || Decision ||5 || 3:00
|-
! style=background:white colspan=9 |
|-  style="background:#cfc;"
| 2012-10-21|| Win||align=left| Kaotam Lookprabaht  || Lumpinee Stadium || Bangkok, Thailand || Decision ||5 || 3:00
|-  style="background:#cfc;"
| 2012-08-10|| Win||align=left| Fahmongkol Sor.Jor.Laiprachin || Lumpinee Stadium || Bangkok, Thailand || Decision ||5 || 3:00
|-  style="background:#fbb;"
| 2012-02-05 || Loss ||align=left| Rungravee Sasiprapa || Channel 7 Boxing Stadium || Bangkok, Thailand || Decision || 5 || 3:00
|-
! style=background:white colspan=9 |
|-  style="background:#cfc;"
| 2011-09-22|| Win ||align=left| Rungruanglek Lukprabat  || Rajadamnern Stadium || Bangkok, Thailand || Decision ||5 || 3:00
|-  style="background:#cfc;"
| 2011-07-02|| Win ||align=left| Pinsiam Sor.Amnuaysirichoke  || Channel 7 Boxing Stadium || Bangkok, Thailand || Decision ||5 || 3:00
|-  style="background:#cfc;"
| 2011-05-31|| Win||align=left| Denchiangkwan Lamtongkarnpeth  || Lumpinee Stadium || Bangkok, Thailand || TKO || ||
|-  style="background:#fbb;"
| 2011-03-08|| Loss||align=left| Kaotam Lookprabaht  || Lumpinee Stadium || Bangkok, Thailand || Decision ||5 || 3:00
|-
! style=background:white colspan=9 |
|-  style="background:#c5d2ea;"
| 2011-02-01|| Draw||align=left| Lertpet Sor Thor Monphonthong || Lumpinee Stadium || Bangkok, Thailand || Decision ||5 || 3:00
|-  style="background:#cfc;"
| 2010-12-23|| Win||align=left| Kaotam Lookprabaht || Rajadamnern Stadium || Bangkok, Thailand || Decision ||5 || 3:00

|-  style="background:#fbb;"
| 2010-06-15|| Loss||align=left| Visanlek Nakhonthong || Lumpinee Stadium ||Bangkok, Thailand || Decision  || 5 || 3:00
|-  style="background:#fbb;"
| 2010-02-26|| Loss||align=left| Muangsee Pumpanmuang || Lumpinee Stadium || Bangkok, Thailand || Decision ||5 || 3:00
|-  style="background:#cfc;"
| 2009-03-06|| Win||align=left| Singdam Chockkanna || Lumpinee Stadium || Bangkok, Thailand || Decision ||5 || 3:00
|-
! style=background:white colspan=9 |
|-  style="background:#cfc;"
| ||Win ||align=left| Saenganan Lukbanyai  || Channel 7 Boxing Stadium || Bangkok, Thailand || Decision ||5 || 3:00
|-  style="background:#cfc;"
|2008-09-27 || Win ||align=left| Rittidet Worathawee || Omnoi Stadium ||  Bangkok, Thailand || Decision ||5 || 3:00

|-  style="background:#fbb;"
|2008-07-19 || Loss||align=left| Rittidet Worathawee ||  || Krabi, Thailand || Decision ||5 || 3:00
|-  style="background:#cfc;"
| 2008- || Win ||align=left| Kangkenlek Sor.Tawarung|| Lumpinee Stadium || Thailand ||TKO || 4 ||
|-  style="background:#cfc;"
| 2007-11-30 || Win ||align=left| Polkrit Kor.Kamnat || Lumpinee Stadium || Bangkok, Thailand ||Decision || 5 || 3:00
|-
| colspan=9 | Legend:

References

Rungphet Wor Rungniran
Living people
1989 births
Rungphet Wor Rungniran